Marshall County is a county located in far western portion of the U.S. state of Kentucky. As of the 2020 census, the population was 31,659. Its county seat is Benton.

It is the only Purchase Area county that does not border another state; a narrow strip of land in neighboring Livingston County separates Marshall County from the Ohio River and the Illinois border. Until July 28, 2015, it was a dry county. On that date residents approved alcohol sales for off-premises consumption, making it a "wet" county.

History
Following population increase in the area, Marshall County was created by the Kentucky legislature in 1842 from the northern half of Calloway County. The first European-American settlers had arrived in about 1818, shortly after the area was bought from the Chickasaw Indians as part of the Jackson Purchase by Gen. Andrew Jackson and Kentucky Gov. Isaac Shelby. The Chickasaw were forced under Indian Removal to move to what became known as Indian Territory, new and much less fertile lands west of the Mississippi River.

Marshall County was named in honor of Chief Justice John Marshall of the United States Supreme Court, who had died in 1835.

Like most of the Jackson Purchase, and reflecting its geographic and family connections to the South, during the American Civil War, Marshall County was strongly pro-Confederate, although the state was neutral. Many local men served in the famous Kentucky Orphan Brigade. On March 23, 1864, detachments of Gen. Nathan Bedford Forrest's Confederate cavalry clashed with Union cavalry near Benton, when each side was scouring the countryside for needed cavalry remounts. A state historical marker stands at the site.

From its settlement until the 1930s, Marshall County was developed primarily for agriculture. In the 1940s, however, the Tennessee Valley Authority created Kentucky Lake as part of its flood control and rural electrification projects initiated by President Franklin D. Roosevelt. The lake established tourism as part of the county's economy, and lakeshore resorts were developed to exploit sports fishing.

Kentucky Dam's cheap and plentiful electricity also attracted chemical and manufacturing plants, mainly in the Calvert City area.

The lake's impoundment resulted in flooding two historic Marshall County towns: Birmingham, six miles north of Fairdealing, and Gilbertsville, at the dam's site, both of which were evacuated. Gilbertsville was relocated west of its original location, but Birmingham residents had to find new homes elsewhere. Gilbertsville was an incorporated town until the 1970s, when its charter was dissolved by public vote. Kentucky Lake (created on the Tennessee River) and Lake Barkley (created on the Cumberland River) were connected by a canal. Together they make up one of the largest man-made bodies of water in the world.

Geography
The county's northeastern border is formed by the Tennessee River and Kentucky Lake.

Adjacent counties
 Livingston County (north)
 Lyon County (east)
 Trigg County (east)
 Calloway County (south)
 Graves County (west)
 McCracken County (west)

National protected area
 Clarks River National Wildlife Refuge (part)

Demographics

As of the census of 2000, there were 30,125 people, 12,412 households, and 8,998 families residing in the county. The racial makeup of the county was 98.57% White, 0.2% Black or African American, 0.17% Native American, 0.15% Asian, 0.01% Pacific Islander, 0.22% from other races, and 0.76% from two or more races. 0.76% of the population were Hispanics or Latinos of any race.

There were 12,412 households, out of which 29.20% had children under the age of 18 living with them, 61.40% were married couples living together, 7.90% had a female householder with no husband present, and 27.50% were non-families. 25.00% of all households were made up of individuals, and 11.90% had someone living alone who was 65 years of age or older. The average household size was 2.38 and the average family size was 2.83.

The age distribution was 21.80% under the age of 18, 7.50% from 18 to 24, 27.00% from 25 to 44, 26.20% from 45 to 64, and 17.50% who were 65 years of age or older. The median age was 41 years. For every 100 females there were 96.10 males. For every 100 females age 18 and over, there were 93.50 males.

The median income for a household in the county was $35,573, and the median income for a family was $43,670. Males had a median income of $36,673 versus $21,941 for females. The per capita income for the county was $18,069. About 6.60% of families and 9.50% of the population were below the poverty line, including 11.60% of those under age 18 and 10.90% of those age 65 or over.

Communities

Cities
 Benton (county seat)
 Calvert City
 Hardin

Census-designated place
 Gilbertsville

Other unincorporated communities

 Aurora
 Big Bear Area
 Brewers
 Briensburg
 Draffenville
 Fairdealing
 Harvey
 Moors Camp Area
 Oak Level
 Olive
 Palma
 Possum Trot
 Sharpe
 Tatumsville

Ghost town
 Birmingham

Annual events
On the first Monday of April, Benton holds its Tater Day. Originating in 1842 as a day for farmers to gather at the county seat to trade their agricultural goods, today Tater Day is a celebration that includes a festival and parade. Tater Day derives its name from the main item traded—sweet potatoes for seed, i.e., for bedding in prepared "seedbeds" to produce slips for growers to transplant to gardens or fields.

On the fourth Sunday of each May, The Big Singing, an all-day sing-along program of Southern Harmony shape note gospel music is held at the county courthouse. The Big Singing, begun in 1884, has a special claim to fame: in 1933 George Pullen Jackson drew attention to the fact that this is the only regular event that sings from William Walker's Southern Harmony; this remains a living tradition to the present day.

Americans celebrate the Fourth of July. Calvert City has AmeriBration and is sponsored by the Calvert Area Development Agency (CADA). Ameribration is one of the Lakes' Biggest Fourth of July Celebrations. Some of the events include: Community Photo Contest, 5K Race and Walk, other community tournaments, Car Show, Children's Train Ride, Arts and Crafts Vendors, Youth and Adult Talent Shows, Water Wall and Slide Ride for children, Kids' Parade, Live Bands, Main Parade, and Fireworks show (45 minutes).

Other annual events include Hardin Day and Aurora Country Festival, celebrated in the small towns of Hardin and Aurora. More recently, the area has become known for the annual Hot August Blues and Barbecue Festival held at Kenlake State Resort Park, which was originally built as a park for African Americans. Marshall County is also home to Jackson Purchase barbecue, a style unique to the region. In Benton, Hutchens Open Pit BBQ has been in continuous operation since the 1940s and 4 Little Pigs has bene open since 2001 . In Aurora there is Belews, a drive-in dairyette open seasonally since the 1950s.

Attractions and other information
Marshall County is the home of Calvert Drive In Theater, the only one in the Purchase area and one of three within an 85-mile radius in far western Kentucky.

Marshall County is also home to the Silver Trail Distillery, where a family legend was revitalized to produce LBL Moonshine, named for the illegal liquor distilled in the "Land Between the Rivers," now the Land Between the Lakes. The distillery and museum are in Hardin and Aurora. The original moonshiner, Cilous, was known to have a sipping ritual when it came time to drink his 'shine: "Take a small sip, don't shoot it, and keep your lips closed. With your lips still closed, swish gently then let it ease down. When it is down to the navel level, open your lips slowly while exhaling. There will be a fresh corn taste on both sides of the mouth and no bitter aftertaste."

Before Interstate 24 rerouted much of US 68 traffic northward, generations spent summer days and nights at The Forgotten Past Amusement Park with its gift shop, go carts, bumper cars, mini golf, museum, and arcade. For many years it hosted an Antique (steel wheeled) Tractor Show.

Marshall County is home to one of the largest and most complete parks in the Purchase area. It has lighted baseball fields, two basketball courts, four soccer fields, two tennis courts, a large fishing pond, large playground, spray park, and multiple picnic pavilions as well as a conference center. It is built upon land donated from a private family in memory of their son who was killed in action in the Vietnam War. In September 2000 the park was dedicated as the Marshall County Park. Later that year the local judge executive Mike Miller appointed the new park board. Upon the Grand Opening the park board had named it Mike Miller Park. Several people protested and the park board renamed it Mike Miller County Park. The original statute dedication as Marshall County Park remains at the entrance of the park. The original park didn't have any mention of veterans in its mission; in response the fiscal court commissioned a large veteran's park adjacent to the main conference center.

Marshall County is home to the FLW Bass Tournament organization, named for founder of Ranger Boats, Forrest L. Wood. Wood is the purveyor of America's largest and most prestigious fishing tournaments, including the FLW Tour, FLW Series, Bass Fishing League, College Fishing and High School Fishing.

Marshall County was part of Walmart's initial growth, as home to one of the earliest stores east of the Mississippi River, No. 143.

Politics
Until the 2018 election, Marshall County's local politics had been a stronghold of the Democratic party. In 2015, all elected county officials were Democrats, except for one: Republican Kevin Neal defeated Melonie Watkins Chambers to finish the unexpired term of longtime County Judge-Executive Mike Miller, who died in office the previous December. 
In the 2018 election, things changed considerably in the county with the re-election of Kevin Neal as the County Judge-Executive along with several fellow Republicans: Danny Carroll as Kentucky Senator of the 1st District; Chris Freeland as the Kentucky House of Representative of the 6th District; Kevin Spraggs as 2nd District County Commissioner; Monti Collins as 3rd District County Commissioner; Eddie McGuire as County Sheriff' and Michael Gordon as County Coroner. Therefore, as of 2018, the local offices of Marshall County have 5 Republicans, 5 Democrats and 1 Independent.

County voters have preferred the Republican candidate for US President in 1972 and in all elections since 2000.

Notable people
 Joe Creason – Longtime reporter and columnist for the Louisville Courier Journal
 Robert H. Grubbs - Winner of the 2005 Nobel Prize in Chemistry
 Terrina Chrishell Stause - American actress; known for her role on the Netflix reality show Selling Sunset, along with previous television roles as Amanda Dillon on All My Children and Jordan Ridgeway on Days of Our Lives.

See also

 Eggner Ferry Bridge
 Dry counties
 Kaintuck Territory
 National Register of Historic Places listings in Marshall County, Kentucky
 Sacred Harp

Resources

Books
 Big Singing Day in Benton, Kentucky: A Study of the History, Ethnic Identity and Musical Style of Southern Harmony Singers, by Deborah Carlton Loftis, Ph.D. dissertation, University of Kentucky, 1987. Review

References

External links
 Marshall County Chamber of Commerce
 Marshall County roadside historical markers
 Marshall County schools
 Marshall County Public Library
 The Southern Harmony Online

 
Kentucky counties
1842 establishments in Kentucky
Populated places established in 1842
Sundown towns in Kentucky